Somyung "Silver" Sim (born September 27, 1984), known by the pseudonym s.s.m~[SiLvEr] is one of the most successful player of the real-time strategy computer game StarCraft.  Also known to be a poker player, he has made the final table of the APPT Macau 2008 (Asia Pacific Poker Tour).

Accomplishments
2003.01 Gembc KTF StarCraft League 1st Place
2004.08 iTV Ranking Event 3rd place
2004.10 Sky Pro-league 2nd Round MVP
2006.08 Sky Pro-league 1st Round MVP
2006.11 Pringles MBCGame StarCraft League 2nd Place
2007.09 Official Ambassador of Game Olympiad, Suwon City
2008 APPT Macau 9th Place- $22,692

References

External links
Silver's fan cafe (Korean)

South Korean poker players
1984 births
Living people